Śrīrāghavakṛpābhāṣyam is a series of Sanskrit commentaries on the Prasthanatrayi (the Brahma Sutra, the Bhagavad Gita, and eleven Upanishads), authored by Rambhadracharya. These commentaries were released on 10 April 1998 by the then Prime Minister of India, Atal Bihari Vajpayee. Rambhadracharya composed a commentary on Narada Bhakti Sutra in 1991, and thus revived the tradition of Sanskrit commentaries on the Prasthanatrayi after five hundred years. This was also the second commentary of the Ramananda Sampradaya on Prasthanatrayi, the first being the Ānandabhāṣyam, composed by Ramananda himself. These commentaries were published by Shri Tulsi Peeth Seva Nyas. The author won the Rajshekhar Samman from the Madhya Pradesh Sanskrit Academy, Bhopal, for the commentaries.

Reviews
Dr. Shivram Sharma, a Sanskrit scholar from Varanasi, wrote in his review of Śrīrāghavakṛpābhāṣyam on the eleven Upanishads that it is replete with novel thoughts and Sanskrit derivations, and that Rambhadracharya has shown Rama as the Pratipādya of the all Upanishads by the wonderful dexterity of Vyutpattis of Sanskrit words. Sharma adds that the style of interspersed Sanskrit translations of the works of Tulsidas further enhances the literary merit of the work. Dr. Vishnu Dutt Rakesh, a Hindi professor and author from Haridwar, said that the Śrīrāghavakṛpābhāṣyam on Bhagavad Gita has the broadest coverage of all Sanskrit commentaries on Gita with "convincing discussion, propounding of theories with evidence, contradiction of others, creative genius and an independent style of composition". Dr. Brajesh Dikshit, Sanskrit scholar from Jabalpur, said that the Śrīrāghavakṛpābhāṣyam on the Prasthānatrayī is formidable and adorns the Ramananda tradition with greatness. He added that the Śrīrāghavakṛpābhāṣyam on Narada Bhakti Sutra and Śrīrāmastavarājastotram are successful in establishing the five Prasthānas in place of the three Prasthānas of Prasthānatrayī.

Philosophy
Rakesh said that the works follow the Ramananda branch of Vishishtadvaita school. There is a fierce contradiction of Advaita school of Vedanta, which is characterized with a "bold declaration" by the commentator at the beginning of the commentary on Bhagavad Gita:

The commentator reiterates the challenge in the Hindi poetic translation of the above verse:

References

Works cited

External links
 
 

Works by Rambhadracharya